Bartolomeo Letterini (or Litterini) (1669-after 1731) was an Italian painter of the Baroque period. He was born at Venice and instructed by his father, Agostino Letterini. He was an imitator of Titian. There is a large canvas by him at San Stae in Venice.

References

1669 births
1731 deaths
17th-century Italian painters
Italian male painters
18th-century Italian painters
Italian Baroque painters
Painters from Venice
18th-century Italian male artists